Kenneth Wiggins Porter  (February 17, 1905  – July 9, 1981) was an American poet and historian.

Life
He graduated from Harvard University in history and business history. He taught at Southwestern College, and Vassar College. He worked for the National Archives from 1941 to 1943, and from 1948 to 1955, for the Business History Foundation. He married Annette MacDonald in 1946. In 1954, was a Fulbright lecturer at Melbourne University.  From 1955 and 1958 he taught at the University of Illinois, and at the University of Oregon, from 1958 to 1972.

His papers are held at the New York Public Library.

Awards
 Golden Rose Award

Works

Poetry

Criticism

History
 
 
 
  (Harvard University Press, 1937).
 The History of Humble Oil and Refining Company with Henrietta M. Larson (Harper and Row, 1959)

References

External links
 The Kansas Poems of Kenneth Wiggins Porter, Washburn University
 "Fairfield Porter with poet Kenneth Koch, ca. 1962"
 

1905 births
1981 deaths
Harvard University alumni
People from Sterling, Kansas
University of Illinois faculty
Academic staff of the University of Melbourne
University of Oregon faculty
Vassar College faculty
20th-century American poets